Drew is an unincorporated community in Forsyth County, in the U.S. state of Georgia.

History
A post office called Drew was established in 1889, and remained in operation until 1904. Drew E. Bennett, an early postmaster, gave the community his first name.

References

Unincorporated communities in Forsyth County, Georgia